The 1990 Amstel Gold Race was the 25th edition of the annual road bicycle race "Amstel Gold Race", held on Sunday April 21, 1990, in the Dutch province of Limburg. The race stretched 249 kilometres, with the start in Heerlen and the finish in Meerssen. There were a total of 191 competitors, with 97 cyclists finishing the race.

Result

External links
Results

Amstel Gold Race
April 1990 sports events in Europe
1990 in road cycling
1990 in Dutch sport
1990 UCI Road World Cup